Diguetia canities, commonly called the desert bush spider, is a species of coneweb spider found in desert and semidesert habitats in the United States from California eastward to Oklahoma and Texas.

This rather hairy spider has a body length of around 9 mm. The rather elongated cephalothorax is orange-brown and covered in short white hairs. The brown abdomen has dark, leaf-like markings bordered with white. The legs are yellow-brown. The sexes are generally similar. As with other members of this family, this spider constructs an elaborate and distinctive web with a domed sheet topped by a tubular retreat which has plant material incorporated. This retreat is used by the female spider to conceal its egg sac. The web is placed up to 60 cm above the ground, often in a bush (hence the common name).

References

 
  (2008): The world spider catalog, version 8.5. American Museum of Natural History.

Diguetidae
Spiders of the United States
Spiders described in 1899